Kamila Żuk (born 18 November 1997) is a Polish biathlete. She competed at the 2018 Winter Olympics. and 2022 Winter Olympics, in Women's individual Biathlon.

Career
Żuk debuted at 2018 Olympic Games in PyeongChang in 2x6km Women + 2x7.5km Men mixed relay and finished on 16th place.

On March 1, 2018, as the first Polish biathlete, she won the title of Junior World Champion in the 12,5 km individual competition with a winning time more than 3 minutes ahead of the 2nd place Biathlete. Two days later, she claimed another gold medal, this time in 7.5 km sprint ahead of Czech Markéta Davidová and French Myrtille Bègue. On March 4, 2018 Żuk added silver medal to her achievements from 2018 Junior World Championships in 10 km pursuit, losing only to Czech Davidová at a loss 28.1 sec.

Results

Olympic Games

Youth/Junior World Championships

Youth/Junior European Championships

References

1997 births
Living people
Biathletes at the 2018 Winter Olympics
Biathletes at the 2022 Winter Olympics
Polish female biathletes
Olympic biathletes of Poland
People from Wałbrzych